Three is a 2010 German drama film written, co-scored and directed by Tom Tykwer. The film was nominated for the Golden Lion at the 67th Venice International Film Festival.

Plot
Hanna and Simon are in a long-term relationship which, though loving, has grown sexually unexciting.  Soon after Simon's mother dies from overdosing on pills, after being diagnosed with advanced pancreatic cancer, he discovers that he has testicular cancer and must undergo surgery and chemotherapy.  The night of his surgery, Hanna has a sexual encounter with a man called Adam, and Simon learns that he had fathered a child seventeen years earlier, although the woman opted for an abortion.  Simon, who had assumed that either he or Hanna was infertile, is assured that he should still be able to have children after his surgery.  During his recovery, Simon and Hanna decide to finally wed.  Shortly beforehand, Simon encounters Adam at the pool and begins an affair with him as well.

The couple's separate affairs lead to greater happiness and sexual desire felt for one another.  Adam, unaware that his two lovers are involved, develops feelings for them both.  The affairs are divulged soon after Hanna discovers that she is pregnant; because she was sleeping with both Adam and Simon at the time of conception, she does not know the identity of the father.  Now separated, both Hanna and Simon never contact Adam.  Hanna moves to England, where she discovers that she is pregnant with twins.  After she receives an invitation to an art gallery in Germany, she reconnects with Simon.  The two admit that they have missed each other, but they also miss Adam.  The film ends with the couple arriving at Adam's flat, where they coalesce into a happy spooning threesome.

Cast
 Sophie Rois as Hanna
 Sebastian Schipper as Simon
 Devid Striesow as Adam
 Angela Winkler as Simon's mother Hildegard
 Annedore Kleist as Lotte
 Alexander Hörbe as Dirk
 Winnie Böwe as Petra
 Hans-Uwe Bauer as Dr Wissmer

See also
 List of lesbian, gay, bisexual or transgender-related films of 2010

References

External links

2010 films
2010 drama films
2010 LGBT-related films
2010s German-language films
Films set in Berlin
Films directed by Tom Tykwer
German LGBT-related films
Films with screenplays by Tom Tykwer
LGBT-related drama films
Male bisexuality in film
Films scored by Tom Tykwer
Films about threesomes
2010s German films